Wame may refer to:

People
 Wame Valentine, actor
 Wame Lewaravu (born 1983), Fijian rugby union player

Places
 Wame, Niger
 , France

Other
 WAME, a radio station licensed to serve Statesville, North Carolina, United States
 WGFY, a radio station licensed to serve Charlotte, North Carolina, United States, which held the call sign WAME from 1969 to 1990
 WSUA, a radio station licensed to serve Miami, Florida, United States, which held the call sign WAME from 1958 to 1969